Jorge Israel Romo Salinas (born 9 January 1990) is a Chilean footballer that currently playing for Chilean footballer who plays as midfielder for Deportes Copiapó.

External links
 
 

1990 births
Living people
Chilean footballers
Primera B de Chile players
Chilean Primera División players
Everton de Viña del Mar footballers
Rangers de Talca footballers
Puerto Montt footballers
Cobresal footballers
San Luis de Quillota footballers
Association football midfielders
Sportspeople from Viña del Mar